The fourth season of The Great American Baking Show, titled The Great American Baking Show: Holiday Edition, premiered December 6, 2018 on the ABC network as part of the year's 25 Days of Christmas lineup.

This is the first season hosted by Spice Girls member Emma Bunton. Returning for their second seasons are Anthony "Spice" Adams and Paul Hollywood. Joining the judging panel is three-time James Beard Award recipient and pastry chef Sherry Yard. This is the first season without original judge Johnny Iuzzini. Iuzzini was dismissed from the ABC network following sexual harassment allegations, days after the season three premiere and, prematurely, pulled the season off the air.

The competition concluded after six weeks, in which Tina Zaccardi was crowned the season winner. Amanda Nguyen and Andrea Maranville finished the competition as runners-up.

Bakers

Results summary

Color key:

Episodes

Episode 1: Cake
Color key:   

 During the showstopper bake, Tina scrapped her original recipe for pumpkin spice cake when it did not rise. She substituted a chocolate cake recipe she knew well, and presented her showstoppers as "Autumn Harvest Cakes".

Episode 2: Pastry

Episode 3: Cookies

Episode 4: Bread

Episode 5: Semi-Final

Episode 6: Final

Ratings

References 

4
2018 American television seasons